The 2013 Judo Grand Prix Samsun was held in Samsun, Turkey from 30 to 31 March 2013.

Medal summary

Men's events

Women's events

Source Results

Medal table

References

External links
 

2013 IJF World Tour
2013 Judo Grand Prix
Grand Prix 2013
Judo
Judo